The CZ 700 is a bolt-action sniper rifle designed and manufactured in the Czech Republic by the Česká zbrojovka Uherský Brod (CZ) company.

It is currently being replaced by the CZ 750 model.

Variants
The CZ 700M1 model is slightly lighter and shorter than the standard model.

External links
World Guns page
Official page CZ S1 M1  replacement for CZ 700

7.62×51mm NATO rifles
Bolt-action rifles
Sniper rifles
Rifles of Czechoslovakia